David Cervinski (8 November 1970 – 16 May 2019) was an Australian footballer who played for the Melbourne Knights, Carlton and Wollongong Wolves in the National Soccer League and for Gombak United in Singapore. Cervinski won four NSL titles, two with the Knights and two with the Wolves. In November 2017, he was honoured by presenting the Mark Viduka Medal, given to the player of the match in the FFA Cup. He was the brother of former footballer Adrian Cervinski. Cervinski died in May 2019 after a long battle with cancer.

References

External links

Place of death missing
1970 births
2019 deaths
Deaths from melanoma
Sportspeople from Geelong
Australian soccer players
Association football defenders
Australian expatriate soccer players
Expatriate footballers in Singapore
Melbourne Knights FC players
North Geelong Warriors FC players
Carlton S.C. players
Gombak United FC players
Wollongong Wolves FC players
Deaths from cancer in Australia
Soccer players from Victoria (Australia)
Australian expatriate sportspeople in Singapore